Proudfoot & Bird was an American architectural firm that designed many buildings throughout the Midwest region of the United States. Originally established in 1882, it remains active through its several successors, and since 2017 has been known as BBS Architects | Engineers.

History
The firm of Proudfoot & Bird was originally established in Huron, Dakota Territory in 1882 by William Thomas Proudfoot (1860-1928) and George Washington Bird (1854-1950). Though they practiced variously in South Dakota, Kansas, Utah and Iowa, they are best known for their works in Iowa.

William T. Proudfoot (who later went by Willis) was born May 2, 1860, in Indianola, Iowa to Elias Proudfoot, a carpenter, and Martha Ann (Barnett) Proudfoot. He attended the local schools, and by 1880 was working as a draftsman for William Foster, then the leading architect of Des Moines. George Washington Bird was born September 1, 1854, in New Jersey. His early life or when he came west is unknown, but he was probably educated in Philadelphia. By 1882, he had joined Proudfoot in Foster's office. That same year, the two young architects went northwest to Huron in what is now South Dakota, and first established the firm of Proudfoot & Bird. At that time the Dakota Territory was at the peak of what is referred to as the Great Dakota Boom, when the territory experienced significant investment and population growth. In 1883 the partners relocated to Pierre, though it was not yet the capital. They designed several buildings in Pierre which survive. It was during this time that Proudfoot briefly went east, spending the winter of 1884–85 in the architecture school of the Massachusetts Institute of Technology. After his return in 1885, when the Dakota Boom was beginning to slow, the partners moved south to Wichita, Kansas, then undergoing an even larger boom. They were more successful in Wichita, where they designed the City Hall, the YMCA, several colleges and universities and many homes and businesses. However, by 1890 the boom had collapsed, and in 1891 the partners went even further west to Salt Lake City.

In Salt Lake City the partners formed a partnership with the established local architect Henry Monheim (1824-1893), which was known as Monheim, Bird & Proudfoot. This firm almost immediately won the competition to design the new Salt Lake City and County Building. Monheim died in 1893, and Proudfoot & Bird was reestablished. In addition to the City and County Building, completed in 1894, they designed several homes and other structures in Salt Lake City. In 1895, with the economy in decline, Proudfoot went to Kansas City, and Bird to Philadelphia. In 1896 they returned to Iowa, and reestablished Bird & Proudfoot in Des Moines, where it would remain. In 1898 they won the job to design Schaeffer Hall at the University of Iowa in Iowa City, a project which cemented their reputation in Iowa, and over the next decade became the leading architects in the state.

In 1910 Proudfoot & Bird was merged with the firm of Hallett & Rawson, and became Proudfoot, Bird & Rawson with third partner Harry D. Rawson (1872-1934). In 1913, owing to ill health, George W. Bird retired, though his name was not removed from that of the firm. In 1925 Proudfoot and Rawson were joined by H. Clark Souers (1888-1970) as partner, and the firm finally dropped Bird's name and became Proudfoot, Rawson & Souers. In 1928 Proudfoot died, and in 1929 the partnership was further expanded to include Oren Thomas (died 1955), a school specialist, and became Proudfoot, Rawson, Souers & Thomas. In 1932 Souers and Thomas both retired, and J. Woolson Brooks (1897-1982) and Elmer H. Borg (1893-1970), who had joined the firm in 1912 and 1913 respectively, joined the partnership. By this time the Great Depression was well underway and the firm's business was severely reduced. Whereas Souers had invested $50,000 to join the partnership, Brooks and Borg only had to contribute $2,000 each. The new firm was known as Proudfoot, Rawson, Brooks & Borg. When Rawson died in 1934, Brooks and Borg were the sole partners. Following World War II, in 1945, the firm was renamed Brooks-Borg. In 1966 they were joined by Paul Skiles (1921-1991) as partner, and the firm became Brooks-Borg-Skiles. It kept this name under several changes of leadership until 2017, when it became BBS Architects | Engineers, which it remains in 2022.

Legacy

Proudfoot & Bird and their successors were the leading architects in Iowa for several decades. Under its founders the firm had a conservative design philosophy, and worked in the popular Revival styles of the time. Early works were designed in the Italianate or Victorian Gothic styles, before the rise in popularity of the Richardsonian Romanesque in the mid-1880s. The architecture at the World's Columbian Exposition in Chicago in 1893 spurred the popularity of Beaux-Arts architecture in the United States, and Proudfoot & Bird followed suit. Though other styles were chosen for other buildings, the Classical architecture of the Beaux-Arts movement was the norm in the firm's work until Proudfoot's death. After this, the surviving members of the firm looked to more modern styles, including the Art Deco, Streamline Moderne and International Style during the Great Depression and lead-up to World War II. After the war, Brooks-Borg embraced Modern architecture, was associated with Eliel Saarinen and Eero Saarinen on several projects, and later designed several Brutalist and Postmodern buildings.

A large number of their pre-war buildings which survive are listed on the United States National Register of Historic Places. Many of these were listed as part of one 1988 study and multiple property submission. In 1988 there were 25 known surviving Proudfoot, Bird & Rawson buildings in Des Moines alone. Their work was also part of the architecture event in the art competition at the 1928 Summer Olympics.

List of works
 First M. E. Church, Kansas Ave and 4th St SE, Huron, South Dakota (1883–84, demolished 1918)
 Central Block, 323 S Pierre St, Pierre, South Dakota (1884, NRHP 1989)
 First National Bank Building, 401 S Pierre St, Pierre, South Dakota (1884)
 Hughes County Courthouse, 104 E Capitol Ave, Pierre, South Dakota (1884, demolished)
 Karcher Block, 366 S Pierre St, Pierre, South Dakota (1884, NRHP 1993)
 Davis Administration Building, Friends University, Wichita, Kansas (1886–88, NRHP 1971)
 "Hillside Cottage" for Willis T. Proudfoot, 303 Circle Dr, Wichita, Kansas (1887, NRHP 1976)
 "Riverside Cottage" for Thomas G. Fitch, 901 Spaulding Ave, Wichita, Kansas (1887, NRHP 1989)
 YMCA Building (former), 332 E 1st St N, Wichita, Kansas (1887–88, NRHP 1972)
 Bethel College Administration Building, Bethel College, North Newton, Kansas (1888–92, NRHP 1972)
 "Fairmount Cottage" for A. S. Parks, 1717 Fairmount Ave, Wichita, Kansas (1888, attributed, NRHP 1985)
 Wallace Hall, Simpson College, Indianola, Iowa (1888, NRHP 1991)
 McCormick School, 855 S Martinson St, Wichita, Kansas (1889–90, NRHP 1978)
 Wichita City Hall (former), 204 S Main St, Wichita, Kansas (1890–92, NRHP 1971)
 Salt Lake City and County Building, 451 Washington Sq, Salt Lake City, Utah (1891–94, NRHP 1970)
 House for Elliott M. S. Best, 1146 S 900 E, Salt Lake City, Utah (1893, NRHP 1980)
 Schaeffer Hall, University of Iowa, Iowa City, Iowa (1898–99) 
 St. Paul's Episcopal Church, 712 Farnham St, Harlan, Iowa (1899-1900, NRHP 1978)
 Dallas County Courthouse, 801 Court St, Adel, Iowa (1900–02, NRHP 1973)
 Marston Hall, Iowa State University, Ames, Iowa (1900–03)
 "Seven Oaks" alterations for Eli Bailey, 707 Audubon St, Sac City, Iowa (c.1900, NRHP 1996)
 Polk County Courthouse, 6th and Mulberry Sts, Des Moines, Iowa (1902–06, NRHP 1979)
 Sciences Library and Biology Building, University of Iowa, Iowa City, Iowa (1902–04) 
 Alumni Hall, Iowa State University, Ames, Iowa (1904–07, NRHP 1978)
 Macbride Hall, University of Iowa, Iowa City, Iowa (1904–08)
 Beardshear Hall, Iowa State University, Ames, Iowa (1906–08)
 Curtiss Hall, Iowa State University, Ames, Iowa (1906–08)
 First United Methodist Church, 10th and Pleasant Sts, Des Moines, Iowa (1906–08, NRHP 1984)
 Greek Orthodox Church of St. George, 1110 35th St, Des Moines, Iowa (1906, NRHP 1987)
 Carnegie Hall, Drake University, Des Moines, Iowa (1907–08)
 Champlin Memorial Masonic Temple, 602 Story St, Boone, Iowa (1907, NRHP 1990)
 Chautauqua Auditorium, Chautauqua Park, Sac City, Iowa (1908)
 First Christian Church (former), 2500 University Ave, Des Moines, Iowa (1908)
 Howard Hall addition, Drake University, Des Moines, Iowa (1908)
 Norman Apartment Building, 3103 University Ave, Des Moines, Iowa (1908, NRHP 1988)
 President's House, University of Iowa, Iowa City, Iowa (1908)
 House for August H. Bergman, 629 First Ave E, Newton, Iowa (1909, NRHP 1989)
 Jasper County Courthouse, 101 1st St N, Newton, Iowa (1909–11, NRHP 1981)
 Warfield, Pratt and Howell Company Warehouse addition, 100 West Court Ave, Des Moines, Iowa (1909, NRHP 1985)
 Colonials Club House, 217 Ash Ave, Ames, Iowa (1910, NRHP 2012)
 Des Moines City Hall, 400 Robert D Ray Dr, Des Moines, Iowa (1910–12, NRHP 1977)
 East High School, 813 E 13th St, Des Moines, Iowa (1910–11)
 MacLean Hall, University of Iowa, Iowa City, Iowa (1910–11)
 Audubon Public Library, 401 N Park Pl, Audubon, Iowa (1911–12)
 Trinity United Methodist Church, 1548 8th St, Des Moines, Iowa (1911, NRHP 1998)
 Colfax Public Library, 25 W Division St, Colfax, Iowa (1912–13)
 Herring Motor Car Company Building, 110 W 10th St, Des Moines, Iowa (1912–13, NRHP 2004)
 Johnson County Savings Bank Building, 102 S Clinton St, Iowa City, Iowa (1912, NRHP 2017)
 Sac City Free Library (former), 1001 W Main St, Sac City, Iowa (1912–13)
 Teachout Building, 500-502 E Locust St, Des Moines, Iowa (1912, NRHP 1999)
 Empress Theatre, 412 8th St, Des Moines, Iowa (1913, demolished 1977)
 Hawkeye Insurance Company Building alterations, 209 4th St, Des Moines, Iowa (1913, NRHP 1986)
 Hubbell Building, 904 Walnut St, Des Moines, Iowa (1913, NRHP 2004)
 Masonic Temple, 1011 Locust St, Des Moines, Iowa (1913, NRHP 1997)
 BPOE Building, 800 Fourth Ave, Grinnell, Iowa (1914)
 Arlington Apartments, 1301 Locust St, Des Moines, Iowa (1915)
 First National Bank Building, 8th and Story Sts, Boone, Iowa (1915–16, NRHP 1989)
 Fort Dodge Municipal Building, 819 First Ave S, Fort Dodge, Iowa (1915)
 Grinnell Herald Building, 813 Fifth Ave, Grinnell, Iowa (1916, NRHP 1991)
 Hotel Ottumwa, 107 E 2nd St, Ottumwa, Iowa (1916–17, NRHP 2012)
 Northwestern Hotel, 321 E Walnut St, Des Moines, Iowa (1916, NRHP 1984)
 D.S. Chamberlain Building, 1312 Locust St, Des Moines, Iowa (1917, NRHP 2007)
 Greene County Courthouse, 114 N Chestnut St, Jefferson, Iowa (1918, NRHP 1978)
 Hotel Fort Des Moines, 10th and Walnut Sts, Des Moines, Iowa (1918–19, NRHP 1982)
 Stuit Hall, University of Iowa, Iowa City, Iowa (1918)
 Corydon Public Library (former), 110 S Franklin St, Corydon, Iowa (1919)
 House for John H. Herman, 711 S Story St, Boone, Iowa (1919, NRHP 1989)
 Lake City Community Memorial Building, 118 E Washington St, Lake City, Iowa (1920, NRHP 1990)
 Medical Education Building, University of Iowa, Iowa City, Iowa (1920–21)
 Apperson Iowa Motor Car Company Building, 1420 Locust St, Des Moines, Iowa (1921, NRHP 2016)
 Equitable Building, 604 Locust St, Des Moines, Iowa (1922–24, NRHP 2015)
 Abraham Lincoln High School, 2600 SW 9th St, Des Moines, Iowa (1922, NRHP 2002)
 Theodore Roosevelt High School, 4419 Center St, Des Moines, Iowa (1922, NRHP 2002)
 Spencer Memorial Chapel, William Penn University, Oskaloosa, Iowa (1922–23)
 Parks Library, Iowa State University, Ames, Iowa (1923–25)
 Pocahontas County Courthouse, 99 Court Sq, Pocahontas, Iowa (1923, NRHP 1981)
 Jessup Hall, University of Iowa, Iowa City, Iowa (1924)
 Iowa Field House, University of Iowa, Iowa City, Iowa (1925–27)
 Fish and Game Pavilion and Aquarium, Iowa State Fairgrounds, Des Moines, Iowa (1926-27 snd 1929, NRHP 1991)
 Food Sciences Building, Iowa State University, Ames, Iowa (1927–28, NRHP 1987)
 Memorial Union, Iowa State University, Ames, Iowa (1927-28 et seq.)
 University of Iowa Hospitals and Clinics, 220 Hawkins Dr, Iowa City, Iowa (1928)
 Des Moines Building, 405 6th Ave, Des Moines, Iowa (1930–31, NRHP 2013)
 Iowa-Des Moines National Bank Building, 520 Walnut St, Des Moines, Iowa (1931–32, NRHP 1979)
 David W. Smouse Opportunity School, 2820 Center St, Des Moines, Iowa (1931, NRHP 2002)
 United States Post Office and Courthouse, 350 W 6th St, Dubuque, Iowa (1932–34)
 Des Moines Fire Department Headquarters (former), 900 Mulberry St, Des Moines, Iowa (1937–38, NRHP 2014)
 Hofmann Building, 101 S Market St, Ottumwa, Iowa (1941, NRHP 2010)
 Cathedral Church of Saint Paul parish house, 815 High St, Des Moines, Iowa (1952, NRHP 2010)
 Building 16, 403 W 4th St N, Newton, Iowa (1913-14)

Gallery of architectural works

Notes

References

Architecture firms based in Iowa
Olympic competitors in art competitions